"Taxi Driver" is a song by Gym Class Heroes.  The song was first released on The Papercut EP, but was also included on the full-length and much more widely released The Papercut Chronicles. In the song's lyrics, frontman Travis McCoy namechecks 26 other bands and artists that Gym Class Heroes enjoy. "Taxi Driver" was the very first video produced for Gym Class Heroes. It was produced, along with many other videos by Bill Pealer, Jason Gillotti, and Ryan Smith long before the band was attached to any record label.

The song was named #20 of the "50 Worst Songs of the '00s" in a 2009 Village Voice article.

Referenced bands (in order of mention)
(However, Travie McCoy has claimed he is unsure as to all the bands referenced, suggesting there are allusions to other bands despite their names not being mentioned.)

Death Cab for Cutie
Dashboard Confessional
Cursive
Bright Eyes
Sunny Day Real Estate
My Chemical Romance
Hey Mercedes
Coheed and Cambria
Fall Out Boy
Jimmy Eat World
Thrice
Brand New
The Postal Service
Planes Mistaken for Stars
At the Drive-In
...And You Will Know Us by the Trail of Dead
Midtown
The Get Up Kids
Scraps and Heart Attacks
The Early November
Thursday
Taking Back Sunday
Jets to Brazil
Story of the Year
Hot Water Music
Elliott
They also mention their recording label, Fueled by Ramen, in the last line.

References

2004 debut singles
Gym Class Heroes songs
2004 songs
Songs written by Travie McCoy
Fueled by Ramen singles